Laevaranna (until 2017 Rannaküla) is a village in Saaremaa Parish, Saare County, Estonia, on the island of Saaremaa. As of 2011 Census, the settlement's population was 5.

Small islet Pihanasv in the Kõiguste Bay (part of the Gulf of Riga) belongs to Laevaranna village.

References

Villages in Saare County